The Holy Down documents a series of shows played by Gravetemple in Israel during the summer of 2006. Illustrations for the series were done by Justin Bartlett.

Track listing

Line up
Attila Csihar - vocals
Stephen O'Malley - guitar
Oren Ambarchi - guitar, drums, bells

References

Gravetemple albums
2007 live albums
Southern Lord Records live albums